= Ado Pharaon =

French artist and comedian

Adonaïs Yankan (also known as Ado Pharaon) is a French artist and comedian best known for his hypnosis shows.
